During the 1998–99 English football season, Crystal Palace F.C. competed in the Football League First Division.

Season summary
Terry Venables was appointed head coach, but the dream of success for the 1998–99 season quickly turned into a nightmare. Goldberg was unable to sustain his financial backing of the club and they went into administration in March 1999. Simon Paterson took charge of the club throughout a spell in which it's very future seemed in serious doubt.

Venables stood down as manager and after some negotiation over his outstanding contract, left the club. In January 1999, Steve Coppell returned to the job once again, and was able to guide Palace to a mid-table finish. With the approval of the administrators, Peter Morley was installed as chairman, in time for the start of the next season.

Final league table

Results
Crystal Palace's score comes first

Legend

Football League First Division

FA Cup

League Cup

Intertoto Cup

Players

First-team squad
Squad at end of season

Other events
The home game against Birmingham in February was used for some scenes in the cult British film Wonderland.

References

Notes

Crystal Palace F.C. seasons
Crystal Palace